In-situ conservation is the on-site conservation or the conservation of genetic resources in natural populations of plant or animal species, such as forest genetic resources in natural populations of Teagan species. This process protects the inhabitants and ensures the sustainability of the environment and ecosystem.

Methods
About 4% of the total geographical area of the country is used for in situ conservation. The following methods are presently used for in situ conservation.

Biosphere reserve
Biosphere reserves cover very large areas, often more than 5000 km2. They are used to protect species for a long time. Currently, there are 18 Biosphere Reserves in India.

National parks
A national park is an area dedicated for the conservation of wildlife along with its environment. A national park is an area which is used to conserve scenery, natural and historical objects. It is usually a small reserve covering an area of about 100 to 500 square kilometers. Within biosphere reserves, one or more national parks may also exist. Currently, there are 103 national parks in India.

Wildlife sanctuaries
A wildlife sanctuary is an area which is reserved for the conservation of animals only. Currently, there are 551 wildlife sanctuaries in India.

Biodiversity hotspots
According to Conservation international, to qualify as a hotspot a region must meet two strict criteria:
 
 it must contain at least 1,500 species of vascular plants (∆ 0.5% of the world's total) as endemics,
 it has to have lost at least 70% of its original habitat.

Gene sanctuary
A gene sanctuary is an area where plants are conserved.
It includes both biosphere reserves as well as national parks.
India has set up its first gene sanctuary in the Garo Hills of Meghalaya for wild relatives of citrus. Efforts are also being made to set up gene sanctuaries for banana, sugarcane, rice and mango.

Community reserves
It is the type of protected area introduced in Wildlife Protection Amendment Act 2002 to provide legal support to community or privately owned reserves which cannot be designated as national park or wildlife sanctuary.

Sacred groves
They are tracts of forest set aside where all the trees and wildlife within are venerated and given total protection.

Benefits
One benefit of in situ conservation is that it maintains recovering populations in the environment where they have developed their distinctive properties. Another benefit is that this strategy helps ensure the ongoing processes of evolution and adaptation within their environments. As a last resort, ex situ conservation may be used on some or all of the population, when in situ conservation is too difficult, or impossible. The species gets adjusted to the natural disasters like drought, floods, forest fires and this method is very cheap and convenient.

Reserves
Wildlife and livestock conservation is mostly based on nothing. This involves the protection of wildlife habitats. Also, sufficiently large reserves are maintained to enable the target species to exist in large numbers. The population size must be sufficient to enable the necessary genetic diversity to survive within the population, so that it has a good chance of continuing to adapt and evolve over time. This reserve size can be calculated for target species by examining the population density in naturally occurring situations. The reserves must then be protected from intrusion or destruction by man, and against other catastrophes.

Agriculture
In agriculture, in situ conservation techniques are an effective way to improve, maintain, and use traditional or native varieties of agricultural crops. Such methodologies link the positive output of scientific research with farmers' experience and field work.

First, the accessions of a variety stored at a germplasm bank and those of the same variety multiplied by farmers are jointly tested in the producers field and in the laboratory, under different situations and stresses. Thus, the scientific knowledge about the production characteristics of the native varieties is enhanced. Later, the best tested accessions are crossed, mixed, and multiplied under replicable situations. At last, these improved accessions are supplied to the producers. Thus, farmers are enabled to crop improved selections of their own varieties, instead of being lured to substitute their own varieties with commercial ones or to abandon their crop. This technique of conservation of agricultural biodiversity is more successful in marginal areas, where commercial varieties are not expedient, due to climate and soil fertility constraints, or where the taste and cooking characteristics of traditional varieties compensate for their lower yields.

See also

Arid Forest Research Institute
Biodiversity
Food plot – the practice of planting crops specifically to support wildlife
Genetic erosion
Habitat corridor
Habitat fragmentation
Refuge (ecology)
Reintroduction
Regional Red List
Restoration ecology
Wildlife corridor

References

Further reading

External links
 In-Situ Conservation, The Convention on Biological Diversity
 Ex-Situ Conservation, The Convention on Biological Diversity
 IUCN/SSC Re-introduction Specialist Group
 IUCN Red List of Threatened Species
 The Convention on Biological Diversity
In situ conservation
 Guidelines: In vivo conservation of animal genetic resources, Food and Agriculture Organization of the UN

Conservation biology
Ecological restoration
Environmental design
Environmental conservation